Canciones de Amor is the title of a compilation album by Mexican singer Alejandra Guzmán. In November, 2006, Sony BMG created a line of compilation albums with romantic songs from Yuri, Ana Gabriel, Angela Carrasco, Lucía Méndez, among others, including Alejandra Guzmán. This album focuses on ballads and the romantic songs of her career. Eight tracks were released as singles and six are album tracks.

Track listing
"Hacer el Amor con Otro" — 4:38
"Angeles Caídos" — 5:10
"No Hay Vacuna Contra el Amor" — 3:09	  
"Loca" — 4:28
"Volveré a Amar" — 3:5
"Morir de Amor" — 4:00	  
"Por Qué Tengo Que Amarte" — 3:14
"Ven" — 4:10
"De Verdad" — 3:19
"Quema Despacio" — 4:37
"Paloma Herida" — 4:22
"Tu Eres Mi Luz" — 3:07
"Bye, Bye, Love" — 3:25
"Set Acustico: Llama Por Favor/Rosas Rojas/Cuidado Con el Corazon" — 6:24

Albums produced by Desmond Child
Alejandra Guzmán compilation albums
2006 compilation albums